Events from the year 1940 in Argentina

Incumbents
 President: Roberto María Ortiz (UCR-A – Concordancia)
 Vicepresident: Ramón Castillo

Governors
 Buenos Aires Province: 
 until 7 March: Manuel Fresco 
 7 March-13 March: Luis Cassinelli
 13 March-27 May: Octavio R. Amadeo
 27 May-4 June: Carlos Herrera
 from 4 June: Octavio R. Amadeo
 Cordoba: Amadeo Sabattini then Santiago del Castillo 
 Mendoza Province: Rodolfo Corominas Segura

Vice Governors
 Buenos Aires Province: Aurelio Amodeo (until 7 March); vacant thereafter (starting 7 March)

Events

January

February
 Intervention of the Catamarca Province

March
 Intervention of the Buenos Aires province

April

May

June
 President Ortiz takes leave from work because of diabetes

July

August
 Construction of the first airplane made in Argentina, a curtiss 75
 Ortiz, during his leave from work, offers his resignation to the Congress amid a political controversy. The Congress does not accept it.

September

October

November
 The Congress discusses a proposal for economic reactivation made by minister Federico Pinedo

December
 Juan Tonazzi is appointed minister of War. He rearranges the top military personnel, promoting supporters of Agustín Pedro Justo

Date unknown
 Radio El Mundo starts the radio drama Los Pérez García, which would last up to 1969

Ongoing
 Argentina keeps a neutral stance in World War II, amid foreign pressure to join the war

Births
April 9 - Chunchuna Villafañe, model, actress and architect
April 30 - Ermindo Onega, footballer (died 1979)
May 15 - Carlos Bielicki, chess master
July 7 - Dora Baret, actress
August 17 - Eduardo Mignogna, film director and screenwriter (died 2006)
September 24 - Amelita Baltar, tango singer
October 17 - Carlos Heller, executive, cooperative banking leader, and politician
date unknown
Cacho Espíndola, actor
Alicia Dujovne Ortiz, journalist* Esteban Courtalon
 Esther Norma Arrostito
 Graciela Paraskevaidis
 Guillermo José Garlatti
 Guillermo Saucedo
 Gustavo Bergalli
 Horacio Usandizaga
 Jesús Taboada
 Jorge Ginarte
 Jorge Kissling
 José Rubinstein
 Juan Carlos Maccarone
 Juan Paletta
 Juan Rosai
 Leonardo Henrichsen
 Luis Brandoni
 Luis Cubilla
 Maria Teresa Luengo
 Mario Acuña
 María Cristina Laurenz
 Miguel Ángel Loayza
 Nacha Guevara
 Nestor Combin
 Osvaldo Lamborghini
 Osvaldo Álvarez Guerrero
 Raúl Zaffaroni
 Roberto Matosas
 Rodolfo Mederos
 Román Quinos
 Silvio Marzolini
 Wálter Machado da Silva

Deaths
 Enrique Mosconi
 Manuel Musto

See also
List of Argentine films of 1940

Bibliography
 

 
Years of the 20th century in Argentina